The Moon Is a Dead World is the debut studio album by American hardcore punk band Gospel. It was released on May 10, 2005 by Level Plane Records. It was the band's only studio album during their initial existence.

Upon its release, the album received positive reviews; the album has since been seen as a defining release in the screamo genre.

Recording and production 
Gospel entered God City Studio with Kurt Ballou in early March 2005. While Ballou already had a set up drum kit in the studio, Roseboom wanted to use his own, so time was spent adjusting his drumkit. The band enjoyed working with Kurt Ballou; despite the fact that Gospel's sound was a departure from his usual hardcore material and the fact the band had one week to record the album, Ballou adjusted well and did not pressure the band during the recording process. "He captured the essence of the music very well, in a short period of time, and made it as painless as possible", Johnathan Pastir recalled.

As most of the songs were already completed by the time he joined the band, Johnathan Pastir only contributes to the songwriting on "A Golden Dawn".

Composition 
The Moon Is a Dead World has been classed as screamo, post-hardcore, progressive rock, grindcore and hardcore punk. The band received comparisons to Genesis, King Crimson, Hawkwind, Glassjaw and Sonic Youth. Pitchfork described the album's riffs as "King Crimson via Converge".

Album title 
The album title was taken from a plaque describing the moon at the American Museum of Natural History in New York City. "When reading the plaque describing the moon, the first sentence reads, “the moon is a dead world,” and we just kept it in mind.", Johnathan Pastir recalled. "We used it for the best reason possible: it sounds cool. In hindsight, I personally think it fits the atmosphere of the record really well." Adam Dooling supported this; "I like how at first glance it reads as a macabre statement, but under closer examination it’s nothing more than an objective assertion."

Release and touring 
The Moon Is a Dead World was released on May 10, 2005 by Level Plane Records on CD and vinyl. The first vinyl press was limited to 200 copies on red with white splatters.

Touring 
To support the record, Gospel toured throughout the East Coast of the US with Menuwar and Converge, creating a buzz for the band within Level Plane and the music industry. During the tour the band became a notorious live act, getting into fights and destroying instruments. a infamous event was at The Owl Music Parlour, where a fire broke out after a drunk fan threw a Christmas tree on a fire created by John Pastir after the show. Overall, the tour was a success for the band, however, they took the praise they were receiving with a grain of salt.

2019 remaster 
In October 2018, it was announced that The Moon Is a Dead World would be getting a reissue on double vinyl. It was remastered by Josh Bonati, and released through Repeater Records on January 11, 2019.

Reception 
Upon its initial release, The Moon Is a Dead World received positive reviews from critics.

Accolades 

* denotes an unordered list

Track listing

Personnel 
Credits adapted from liner notes and Bandcamp.Gospel

 Adam Dooling – vocals/guitar
 Sean Miller – bass guitar
 Vincent Roseboom – drums
 Johnathan Pastir – keyboards/guitar

Production

 Kurt Ballou –  producer, engineer, recordingArtwork
 Alec Horihan – cover art
 Dima Drjuchin – design
 Gospel – design

Remaster

 Josh Bonati – remastering

References 

2005 debut albums
Gospel (hardcore punk band)